How to Be a Perfect Person in Just Three Days is a 1984 American television family comedy film directed by Joan Micklin Silver and written by Bruce Harmon, based on the 1982 children's book Be a Perfect Person in Just Three Days! by Stephen Manes. It stars Wallace Shawn, Ilan Mitchell-Smith, and Hermione Gingold, and is about a twelve-year-old boy named Milo, a hopeless klutz who happens upon a mysterious advertisement in the paper for becoming a perfect person. A three-day course devised by a peculiar man, Dr. Silverfish, Milo enrolls and manages to complete the strange tasks. Only after completing the course does Milo realize perfection is not all it's cracked up to be.

The film first aired on PBS on October 4, 1984, as part of the series WonderWorks, and was regularly shown on The Disney Channel in the mid-1980s.

Cast
 Wallace Shawn as Professor Silverfish
 Ilan Mitchell-Smith as Milo Crimpley
 Hermione Gingold as Miss Sandwich
 Sarah Boyd as Jenny Hillard
 Kate McGregor-Stewart as Mrs. Crimpley
 Lenny Von Dohlen as Erik Crimpley
 Ned Boyd as Frankie Crimpley
 B.J. Barie as Norbert Sandhill
 John Rothman as Contest Judge
 Joey Ginza as Mr. Yamata
 Jodi Long as Mrs. Yamata

References

External links
 
 
 

1984 films
1984 comedy films
1980s children's comedy films
1980s English-language films
American children's comedy films
American comedy television films
Films directed by Joan Micklin Silver
Films based on children's books
Films scored by David Michael Frank
PBS original programming
Television films based on books
1980s American films